The 1982–83 Scottish Cup was the 98th staging of Scotland's most prestigious football knockout competition. The Cup was won by Aberdeen who defeated Rangers in the final.

First round

Matches were played on 11 December 1982 with the postponed games played a week later.

Replay

The replay was held on 20 December 1982.

Second round

Replay

Second Replay

Third round

Replays

Second Replay

Third Replay

Fourth round

Replay

The match was abandoned after 103 minutes due to a floodlight failure.

Second Replay

Quarter-finals

Semi-finals

Replay

Final

References

Scottish Cup seasons
1982–83 in Scottish football
Scot